Pindi Bhattian (Punjabi) is a city and the administration headquarters of Pindi Bhattian Tehsil, Hafizabad District in Punjab, Pakistan. It is famous for being the birth place of a 16th-century Punjabi folk hero, Dulla Bhatti who led revolts against the Mughal rule in the Punjab.

Commercially Pindi Bhattian lies in the heart of Punjab and North Pakistan. Pindi Bhattian is also on the track for a fast connection through M2 to major cities like Lahore, Sheikhupura, Islamabad, and Peshawar. Through M3, Pindi Bhattian is connected with Faisalabad, Multan and connecting to major cities of Baluchistan and Sindh like Karachi. E3, (Expressway) is being upgraded to connect Sialkot via Wazirabad, whereas Pindi Bhattian is also connected to Hafizabad, Gujranwala, and Daska. On the western side it is connected to a major city like Jhang, Sargodha, and Mianwali. Mianwali being the main city of the Western CPEC route would be another commercial hub that will connect KPK and Punjab. The prominent villages in surrounding Pindi Bhattian are Ghubrika, Macho Nikka (Officers Valley), Mustafabad, Kot Nakka, Shah Behlol, Kaseesay, Thatha Jahid Amir wala, Nauthen, Khuram Chorera, Thatha Khero Matmal, Bahuman (Crescent Bahümán Limited), Thathi Behlol Pur, Tahli Goraya, Dhalkey, Sabat Shah, Par Ghusroo, Chokerian (village of Kharal families). Castes of Pindi Bhattian are Bhatti, Kharal, Arrain, khatri, Sial and Tarar.

Background
It is one of the ancient towns of Pakistan and the home town of Dulla Bhatti, a 16th-century heroic rebel of Punjab. Pindi Bhattian's economy also mostly depends upon agriculture. It has mostly English medium institutions for education. All the secondary and intermediate educational institutions are affiliated with BISE Gujranwala. Qutab Din Pehlwan Awan was one of the best wrestler of Punjab in 1965 till 1985"Dulle di bar: Dulla Bhatti and his homeland", a book by Asad Saleem Sheikh about Dulla Bhatti, presents a comprehensive view of Pindi Bhattian in the times of Mughal Empire.

Communication
Pindi Bhattian is situated on Motorway M2 and is considered an important interchange of M2. Moreover, it is also situated on Shiekhupura-Sargodha-Mianwali Highway. A motorway leads to Faisalabad from Pindi Bhattian known as M3. Another highway connects Pindi Bhattian to Wazirabad via Jalalpur Bhattian and Rasul Pur which is being converted into Expressway E3 under NHA. A highway connects Pindi Bhattian to Chiniot and Jhang. So we can say that Pindi Bhattian is a junction of many important motorways/highways. There is no railway station in the city, the nearest railway station is that of Sukheke Mandi.

Dahar, Arain, khatri, Hanjra, Kharal, Toor, Goraya, Waseer, Bhatti, Lodhra,Mughal are dominant tribes of this area.

See also 
 Bhawana
 List of schools in Pakistan
 Nautheh
Abdullah Bhatti (popularly referred to as the "Son of Punjab" or "Robin Hood of Punjab", sometimes spelled Dullah Bhatti and also known as Rai Abdullah Bhatti) is a Punjabi folk hero who supposedly came from the Punjab region of medieval India and led a revolt against Mughal rule during the reign of the Mughal emperor Akbar.[1] He is entirely absent from the recorded history of the time, and the only evidence of his existence comes from Punjabi folk songs.[2]

References 

City Websites
 TMA Pindi Bhattian Website
Maps
 Pindi Bhattian at Google Maps
 Pindi Bhattian at WikiMapia

Hafizabad District
Populated places in Hafizabad District
Tehsils of Punjab, Pakistan